Elena Dabija is a librarian and activist from Moldova. She is the director of the International Academic Center "Mihai Eminescu" in Chişinău. Dabija was awarded, by a presidential decree, with Romania's highest state decoration – the Order of the Star of Romania.

References

External links 
 The star called Mihai Eminescu – In memoriam
 PETITION To the Council of Europe, To the OSCE, To the UN, Chisinau, 10th  of April, 2009

Moldovan writers
Moldovan activists
Moldovan librarians
Women librarians
Moldovan women
Living people
Year of birth missing (living people)